is a former Japanese football player.

Playing career
Shiozawa was born in Sizuoka Prefecture on November 11, 1982. He joined J1 League club Shimizu S-Pulse from youth team in 2001. Although he played 2 matches as substitute forward in 2002 J.League Cup, he could only play these match until 2003 and retired end of 2003 season.

Club statistics

References

External links

1982 births
Living people
Association football people from Shizuoka Prefecture
Japanese footballers
J1 League players
Shimizu S-Pulse players
Association football forwards